Proud syndrome is a very rare genetic disorder which is characterized by severe intellectual disabilities, corpus callosum agenesis, epilepsy, and spasticity. It is a type of syndromic X-linked intellectual disability.

Signs and symptoms 

The following list comprises the symptoms this disorder causes:

 Corpus callosum agenesis
 Severe intellectual disabilities: IQ between 20 and 34
 Microcephaly
 Epilepsy
 Severe developmental delays
 Short stature
 Spasticity
 Dystonia
 Limb contractures
 Hypospadias
 Cryptorchidism
 Renal dysplasia
 Intersex genitalia
 Scoliosis
 Supraorbital ridge prominence
 Unibrows
 Large eyes
 Hirsutism
 Nystagmus
 Large ears
 Strabismus
 Optic atrophy
 Inguinal hernia

Symptoms list consists of combined information from GARD and OrphaNet, people with the disorder may not always have all the symptoms.

Causes 

This condition is caused by X-linked recessive mutations in the ARX gene, in chromosome Xp21.3. Affected males often have symptoms which are more severe than the rare affected females. This gene is thought to be important in interneuronal migration, neuronal proliferation and embryonic brain and testes differentiation.

Epidemiology 

According to OMIM, only 37 cases have been described in medical literature.

References 

Rare genetic syndromes
X-linked recessive disorders
Syndromes with intellectual disability
Syndromes affecting the nervous system